{{Infobox person
| name                = Andrew White
| image               = Andrew White at Manx LitFest.jpg
| caption            = Andrew White at Manx LitFest
| birth_name  = Andrew Robert White
| birth_date  = 
| birth_place = Doncaster, West Riding of Yorkshire, England
| occupation         = writer, film-maker, broadcaster
| years_active=1997–present
| spouse(s)  = Amanda Hugill (2001–present)
| children   = 2 
| height             = 
| nationality        = British
| credits            = {{nowrap|The Walker Mysteries (2022–present)Walks Around Yorkshire with Andrew White (2022–present)Walks Around Britain (2016–present)East Yorkshire Walks with Andrew White (2015)}}
| website    = 
}}

Andrew White (born 22 February 1974, Doncaster, West Riding of Yorkshire) is a writer, filmmaker and broadcaster.

He is known for his mellow and distinctive Doncaster-area accent and his friendly, passionate presenting style. He is most associated with the multimedia brand Walks Around Britain for which he is the senior editor and the presenter/producer of the associated TV series.

In February 2022, he released his first novel "A New World"; the first story in The Walker Mysteries, a series he created.

Early life and education
White was brought up in the Armthorpe area of Doncaster, South Yorkshire, and attended Shaw Wood Infants and Junior School in the village and then Armthorpe Comprehensive School. In the Sixth Form at Armthorpe Comprehensive School, White made television programmes such as game shows in the Common room and then edited them together with graphics from his Commodore Amiga computer. These programmes gained him an unconditional offer to join the Electronic Media Video Production course at Wolverhampton Polytechnic in 1992. He graduated in 1994 from the University of Wolverhampton as the polytechnic had since converted to a university.

Career
After leaving university, White freelanced for several broadcasters before moving to Italy to work at the new Orbit Satellite Television network at the Sapienza Network Center in the Tor Sapienza area of Rome. Upon returning to the UK, he studied at the now closed Northern Media School – a part of Sheffield Hallam University, and then returned to his home town of Doncaster to set up his own production company Nova Productions.

With his passion for transport, White was interested in making programmes about railways, buses, trams and trolleybuses, and joined with his lifelong friend Gareth Atherton to release some programme on VHS video cassette. The first release was in 1997 – Buses of the South Yorkshire PTE : 1974–1986 – and was produced using archive Super 8 film telecined and edited into a 60-minute documentary, with authentic vehicle sounds painstakingly dubbed onto the previously silent cine film. White and Atherton went on to produce over 50 transport programme which were released on VHS and later DVD-Video until 2005 as Atherton had changed jobs and moved to Sheffield.

White changed from direct sales of programmes on DVD to making transport programmes for other production companies to release and sell on their video label. This continued until 2008 when retailers which sold these DVDs like Woolworths collapsed and others like WH Smiths stopped selling DVDs in their stores. The commissions for these programmes began to dry up and White decided he needed to change track.

Knowing that something was changing, White registered the domain name www.walksaroundbritain.co.uk in April 2006 with the intend on doing something about his other passion of walking. He ideas grew whilst watching the Wainwright Walks series on BBC Four in 2007, presented by Julia Bradbury. With his first child at the age of four at the time, he decided to build a website featuring much more accessible walks than Alfred Wainwright promoted in his guide books. He launched the Walks Around Britain website in 2009, which became popular by focusing on walks between 2 – 8 miles and on walks with stories rather than always having the best views. White launched the Walks Around Britain podcast in 2012 and in January 2016 the first edition of Walks Around Britain was broadcast – with White presenting and producing the series.

 Writing 
White's first professional writing feature was in Lakeland Walker magazine, quickly followed by Countryfile.

He regularly writes for magazines such as Countryfile, Walk, Coast, RAIL, BBC Sky at Night, Your Dog, Dogs Today amongst others.

White was commissioned by AA Publishing to update some of the walks in their book 50 Walks in the Yorkshire Dales in 2013 and in the same year they commissioned him to write a completely new guide book for him home county of Yorkshire. The 90,000 word book was released in 2014 and was noted for being one of the few guide books to cover the whole of the county of Yorkshire – not just the popular places. He was commissioned to update the AA Guide to Yorkshire in 2015 which was published in 2016, and again in 2017 which was published in 2018.

 Radio 
White is a regular guest on BBC Local Radio stations, appearing mostly on BBC Radio Sheffield, BBC Radio Humberside, BBC Radio Leeds, BBC Radio Lincolnshire, BBC Radio York and BBC Radio Manchester mainly talking about walking and the great outdoors. Because of his freelance writing on railway topics, BBC Radio Lancashire and BBC Hereford & Worcester often invite White to talk about transport issues, as does on television on the BBC News Channel.

He has also been a regular panellist on BBC Radio Sheffield's Saturday afternoon panel show Live-ish hosted by Bernie Clifton.

In 2018, White co-produced a documentary for BBC Radio 2 about the 60th anniversary of the children's TV programme Blue Peter. The 60 minute programme was broadcast on Tuesday 16 October 2018 – the actual day of the 60th anniversary – and was a Made in Manchester production for BBC Radio 2.

 Television 
White's first appearance on television was as a contestant on the BBC One Saturday early-evening game show First Class, in which the team from Armthorpe Comprehensive School lost against a team from Montagu School in Kettering.

He presented and produced the eponymously named one-off programme East Yorkshire Walks with Andrew White in 2015, which was commissioned by the local TV channel Estuary TV. The programme was intended to be a pilot for a possible series, but Estuary TV were not able to raise the necessary sponsorship to make it happen. The two walks filmed for the programme were subsequently used in the first and second series of Walks Around Britain.

White used the concepts behind East Yorkshire Walks with Andrew White to format a new TV series based on his Walks Around Britain website, and the first episode of the Walks Around Britain TV series was broadcast on 22 January 2016 on Community Channel. He is currently the lead presenter and presents at least one walk in every episode. White insists on walking every one of the routes in the TV series, so he can write the scripts for the voice-overs, and once stated he walks around 2,000 miles a year.

In March 2020, White's company Nova Productions was commissioned by Together TV to produce a spin-off series dedicated to Yorkshire, Walks Around Yorkshire, with White again presenting and producing the series. Delays caused by the worldwide outbreak of Covid-19 meant the series has yet to enter production.

The Walker Mysteries
In July 2021, White announced on his Twitter account he had been working on a new mystery crime drama project, called The Walker Mysteries, based around a lead character of DCI Charlotte Walker, and her border collie dog Bronte. White posted on the Twitter thread it would be a feel-good crime series for television, in the same vein as Death In Paradise.

White tweeted in October 2021 he had completed the first episode of The Walker Mysteries, and was now in the process of writing the story as a novel.

The book, "A New World", was released on White's 48th birthday and is the first in at least four books in the series White is committed to writing.

White tweeted in January 2022 there could be the possibility of a full-cast audio drama version of "A New World".

The second book, "Home To Roost", is due out in late 2022.

 Personal Appearances 
White makes many personal appearances at various events across the country. He was the cornerstone of the Explore Britain stage at the first Countryfile Live event in 2016, and again in 2017, and has given talks at the Caravan, Camping and Motorhome Show and the British Tourism and Travel Show over the years.

He is a regular at literary festivals taking part in events ranging from workshops to walk and talk events. He also leads walks a walking festivals across the country too.

He is involved in the Get Doncaster Moving campaign, and attends events in the borough to promote walking.

 Ordnance Survey #GetOutside Champion 
Because of his work in passionately encouraging more people to get out walking, White was chosen to be one of the 60 Ordnance Survey #GetOutside Champions for 2018/9.  He continued to be a #GetOutside Champion for 2020 and 2021 through the various lock-downs in the UK, and has been selected to continue through 2022.

South Yorkshire Way
In 2014, White launched the South Yorkshire Way – two interlinked long-distance footpaths in his home county of South Yorkshire. One of the routes – the Boundary Route – follows the border of the county and is 171 miles in length, whilst the Central Route is a 98 miles route through the middle of the county, taking in the four constituent conurbations of Doncaster, Rotherham, Barnsley and Sheffield.

He devised the routes as a response to South Yorkshire  often being overlooked for walking, and to celebrate 2014 being the 40th anniversary of the formation of the county of South Yorkshire.

White has stated his aim is to get the routes fully waymarked and recognised on Ordnance Survey maps.

Awards and honours
 MyOutdoors "Best Digital Media Production", 2016 and 2017 

BooksThe AA Guide to Yorkshire – first edition,   AA Publishing, 201450 Walks in the Yorkshire Dales,   AA Publishing, 2014The AA Guide to Yorkshire – second edition,   AA Publishing, 2016The AA Guide to Yorkshire – third edition,   AA Publishing, 201850 Walks in the Yorkshire Dales,   AA Publishing, 2019A New World: The Walker Mysteries book 1,   Nova Books, 2022

Filmography
Television

 Personal life 
White married Amanda Hugill on Friday 17 August 2001 at High Melton, South Yorkshire. They have two daughters, who both regularly appear on Walks Around Britain with their father. White's eldest daughter, Alannah, was a Doncaster Youth Councillor and a Member of the UK Youth Parliament for Doncaster and spoke in the chamber of the House of Commons. White's youngest daughter, Olivia, competes in dog agility with two of the families' six border collies, under the team name Livgility''.

He is a supporter of Doncaster Rovers and Wolverhampton Wanderers. White is left-handed, has dyslexia and has vitiligo.

References

External links
 Official Andrew White site
 

1974 births
Living people
Writers with dyslexia
Alumni of the University of Wolverhampton
People from Armthorpe
People from the Metropolitan Borough of Doncaster
Television personalities from South Yorkshire
English television presenters
Travel broadcasters
English television producers
Writers from Yorkshire
British male writers
Male non-fiction writers
English travel writers
Rail transport writers
English male novelists
21st-century English male writers
21st-century English novelists
21st-century English writers
English crime fiction writers
Walkers of the United Kingdom